Axel Smeets (born 12 July 1974 in Brussels, Belgium) is a former Association football and football manager, who played as a defender and could also play as a midfielder.

Career
During his career he played for several Belgian clubs and also played overseas for UD Salamanca, Sheffield United (where he got sent off on his debut against Portsmouth) and MKE Ankaragücü, where he had several experiences (good and bad) and ended his career in Norway with HamKam due to a hip injury. The bad recovery from this injury prevented him from signing a 3 years contract for Club Brugge.  He also won 25 caps without scoring for the Belgium Under-21s.

The Norwegian Athletes Association had Smeets as right back on their football Team of the Year 2004.

After passing his UEFA A Licence, he decided to take the FIFA Players' Agent Exam, which he also successfully passed. He's now devoting himself to his player's careers. He also coaches the St. John's International School Boys Varsity football team.

References

External links
 

1974 births
Living people
Belgian footballers
Association football defenders
Association football midfielders
Standard Liège players
K.A.A. Gent players
UD Salamanca players
Sheffield United F.C. players
K.V. Kortrijk players
Lierse S.K. players
MKE Ankaragücü footballers
Hamarkameratene players
Association football utility players
Expatriate footballers in Norway
Belgian expatriate sportspeople in Norway
Eliteserien players
Belgian Pro League players
Expatriate footballers in England
Expatriate footballers in Turkey
Expatriate footballers in Spain
Footballers from Brussels
Belgian expatriate sportspeople in Spain
Belgian expatriate sportspeople in England
Belgian expatriate sportspeople in Turkey